The 2011–12 Országos Bajnokság I is the 106th season of the Országos Bajnokság I, Hungary's premier Water polo league.

Teams

Final standing

Sources 

Seasons in Hungarian water polo competitions
Hungary
2011 in water polo
2011 in Hungarian sport
2012 in water polo
2012 in Hungarian sport